Amelia Nava is the founder and president of Auxilio y Amistad (Aid and Friendship), based in Tiffin, Ohio. Nava was inducted into the Ohio Women's Hall of Fame in 1986 for her work providing community services to Mexican-American migrant farm workers.

In 2012, the Farmworker Agencies Liaison Communication and Outreach Network (FALCON) recognized Nava with their Advocate for Community Service award.

References 

People from Tiffin, Ohio
Year of birth missing (living people)
American people of Mexican descent
Living people
21st-century American women